Llandudno Swifts were a football club from Llandudno who existed during the late Victorian era. The club were first mentioned in 1889.  They competed in the Combination, North Wales Coast League, Welsh Cup, FA Cup and North Wales Coast Cup. The club was wound up in 1901 after a period of professionalism.
Following the demise of Llandudno Swifts, a new team Llandudno Amateurs were formed.

Colours

Seasons

Cup history

Honours

League
North Wales Coast League Division 1
Winners : 1897, 1898
Runners-up : 1894

Cup
Welsh Amateur Cup
Winners : 1892

North Wales Coast Cup
Winners : 1897
Runners-up : 1895, 1896

North Wales Coast Junior Cup
Runners-up : 1897

References

Football clubs in Wales
Defunct football clubs in Wales
Llandudno
Association football clubs disestablished in 1901
Association football clubs established in 1889
North Wales Coast League clubs